The Ashberham river (in French: rivière Ashberham) is a tributary of Grand lac Saint François which constitutes the head lake of the Saint-François River. The course of the Ashberham River crosses the territory of the municipality of Saint-Joseph-de-Coleraine, in the Les Appalaches Regional County Municipality, in the administrative region of Chaudière-Appalaches, on the South Shore of the St. Lawrence River, in Quebec, Canada.

Geography 
The main neighboring watersheds of the Ashberham River are:
 north side: Bécancour River, Bécancour Lake;
 east side: rivière de l'Or;
 south side: Grand lac Saint François;
 west side: Lake Noir, Bisby River, Bécancour River.

The Ashberham River has its source on the southern flank of the Collines de Bécancour, that is to say to the southwest of the Thetford Mines airport.

From there, the river descends on  first towards the southeast, then the south and the southwest, until it empties on the north shore of Caribou Lake (altitude: 331) that the current crosses over  towards the southwest. This lake is located to the south of Collines Rééd and Colline Crabtree, to the south-east of Mont Quarry and to the east of Colline Provençal. The Thetford Mines mining sites are located on the northwest side of these mountains. The northern slope of the lake is mountainous. Its mouth flows to the southwest of the lake.

This lake is completely surrounded by chalet.

The current crosses the "Petit lac Saint-François" on  towards the southwest to the mouth of the lake located to the south.

Toponymy 
The toponym Rivière Ashberham was officially registered on December 5, 1968, at the Commission de toponymie du Québec.

Notes and references

See also 

 Saint-François River, a stream
 Grand lac Saint François, a watercourse
 Les Appalaches Regional County Municipality (MRC)
 Saint-Joseph-de-Coleraine, a municipality
 List of rivers of Quebec

Les Appalaches Regional County Municipality
Rivers of Chaudière-Appalaches